David Alan Sonenberg is an American music manager, and the founder of the music management company DAS Communications.

He is the producer of the Oscar-winning film When We Were Kings (1997).

Early life and education
Born and raised in New York, Sonenberg received a degree in Theater and Political Science at Tufts University and a juris doctor at Harvard Law School. Since 1972, he has been a licensed attorney in New York State.

Career
Sonenberg joined the entertainment law firm of Weissberger & Frosch. There, he represented Broadway and Off-Broadway musical productions including Hair, Godspell and Cabaret.

DAS Communications
Sonenberg then established his own law firm and began DAS Communications Ltd., a full-service management company located in New York and Los Angeles for artists in the entertainment industry. DAS's first management project, Meat Loaf's Bat Out of Hell, set an industry record for a debut album with worldwide record sales to date of more than 50 million. Other clients of DAS Communications have included Jim Steinman, Jimmy Cliff, Southside Johnny, Jimmy Iovine, BeBe & CeCe Winans, Keith Thomas, The Spin Doctors, Joan Osborne, Spacehog, The Fugees including Lauryn Hill, The Black Eyed Peas, John Legend, Kesha, Saraya and Indiggo. To date, artists represented by DAS Communications have written, produced, and performed recordings with sales totaling in excess of 300 million records worldwide.

DAS Ventures Ltd., another of the DAS family of companies, entered into agreements with Yoko Ono and the Estate of John Lennon in 1997, which culminated in the launch of The John Lennon Songwriting Contest.

Productions
1997 saw the release of Sonenberg's first film project, the acclaimed documentary When We Were Kings, about boxer Muhammad Ali, for which Sonenberg received an Academy Award for Best Documentary Feature. In 2002, Sonenberg produced Dance of the Vampires on Broadway.

Personal

Sonenberg has two daughters, and enjoys table tennis.

References

External links

Year of birth missing (living people)
Living people
Tufts University School of Arts and Sciences alumni
Harvard Law School alumni
New York (state) lawyers
Producers of Best Documentary Feature Academy Award winners